Edward Hawkins (January 21, 1829 in Stony Brook, Suffolk County, New York – June 10, 1908 in Jamesport, Suffolk Co., NY) was an American manufacturer and politician from New York.

Life
He was the son of Daniel Shaler Hawkins (1798–1868) and Sophia (Smith) Hawkins (1802–1841). He attended the public schools, and then went to sea, becoming a ship captain. In 1870, he and his brothers began the manufacture of  fish meal and fish oil from menhadens.

He was a Democratic member of the New York State Senate (1st D.) in 1890 and 1891, defeating his brother Simeon S. Hawkins who ran on the Republican ticket for re-election.

Edward Hawkins died on June 10, 1908, at his home in Jamesport.

One of his daughters was married to Congressman Joseph M. Belford (1852–1917).

Sources
 The New York Red Book compiled by Edgar L. Murlin (published by James B. Lyon, Albany NY, 1897; pg. 403)
 Biographical sketches of the members of the Legislature in The Evening Journal Almanac (1891)
 Simeon S. Hawkins at Sweezey Genealogy
 Capt. Edward Hawkins in NYT on June 11, 1908

1829 births
1908 deaths
Democratic Party New York (state) state senators
People from Riverhead (town), New York
19th-century American politicians